Noel Portal Pedregosa is a Filipino prelate of the Roman Catholic Diocese of Malaybalay, appointed by Pope Francis on June 29, 2021. He will follow the steps of Jose Cabantan after he was made the Archbishop of Cagayan de Oro in August 2020. Pedregosa took possession of the Roman Catholic Diocese of Malaybalay on September 14, 2021.

Biography 
Pedregosa was born on October 18, 1964, in M'lang, Cotabato, Philippines. He studied philosophy at St. Isidro College in Malaybalay, Bukidnon after studying high school at Loyola High School Don Carlos He also studied theology at St. John Vianney Theological Seminary in Cagayan de Oro. He also has a degree of Licentiate of Sacred Scripture (S.S.L.) from Loyola School of Theology in Ateneo de Manila University.

He was ordained a priest on September 11, 1991. Since 2017, he is the Vicar General of the Roman Catholic Diocese of Malaybalay and rector of Saint Isidro Cathedral. In July 2020, he was made the administrator of the Roman Catholic Diocese of Malaybalay.

On September 14, he was be Consecrated to the Episcopate and Installed as Bishop of Malaybalay by his Predecessor Most Rev. Jose Cabantan, Archbishop of Cagayan de Oro and co-Consecrators: Most Rev. Angelito Lampon and Most Rev. Raul Dael.

References

1964 births
Filipino Roman Catholic bishops
21st-century Roman Catholic bishops in the Philippines
Living people